Portland's Centers for the Arts (stylized as Portland'5 Centers for the Arts), formerly known as the Portland Center for the Performing Arts (PCPA), is an organization within Metro that runs venues for live theatre, concerts, cinema, small conferences, and similar events in Portland, Oregon, United States. 

Established in 1987, the PCPA consists of three separate buildings: the Arlene Schnitzer Concert Hall, Antoinette Hatfield Hall, and Keller Auditorium.

Hatfield Hall itself is sometimes erroneously referred to as the Portland Center for the Performing Arts. PCPA is the fifth-largest center for performing arts in the United States, with more than 1,000 performances and one million patrons annually (as of 2007).

PCPA changed its name to "Portland'5 Centers for the Arts" in 2013.  The "5" in the brand name is intended to highlight that the organization has five venues, counting separately the three theaters that occupy Antoinette Hatfield Hall.

Performance Facilities

The center includes five distinct performance facilities with varying capacities:

Newmark Theatre (880 seats)
Arlene Schnitzer Concert Hall (2,776 seats)
Brunish Theatre (200 seats)
Keller Auditorium (2,992 seats)
Winningstad Theatre (304 seats)

See also
List of concert halls
Mark Hatfield

References

External links
 Portland'5 Centers for the Performing Arts (official website)

1987 establishments in Oregon
Barton Myers buildings
Concert halls in the United States
Metro (Oregon regional government)
Music venues in Portland, Oregon
Organizations based in Portland, Oregon
Performing arts centers in Oregon
Theatres in Portland, Oregon